ABS-CBN Film Productions, Inc. (doing business as Star Cinema or ABS-CBN Films) is a Filipino film studio and film and television production company and film distributor headquartered in Quezon City. It is one of the major film studios in the Philippines, along with Viva Films and Regal Entertainment. Star Cinema has produced and released most of the highest-grossing Philippine films of all time. Star Cinema, along with its subsidiaries and the now-defunct MOR 101.9 Manila, forms the Star Creatives Group, the main entertainment division of media conglomerate ABS-CBN Corporation.

History

Vanguard Films (1982–1989)
Vanguard Films was formed in 1983. It was headed by Simon Ongpin and Charo Santos-Concio.

In 1985, the serial komiks by Nerissa Cabral, Hindi Nahahati ang Langit was adapted into a film and it stars Christopher de Leon, Lorna Tolentino, Edu Manzano, and Dina Bonnevie. The said film was directed by Mike de Leon but uncredited due to a disagreement between him and the producers.

Vision Films (1989–1993)
In 1989, while ABS-CBN continued to expand its reach to the Filipino nation, the driving forces of the re-established TV network under Charo Santos-Concio formed a film company Vision Films. It was operated independently from ABS-CBN and Regal Films. The first film offering of the company was Kailan Mahuhugasan ang Kasalanan (1989), directed by Lino Brocka. Throughout its short existence, all of the films produced by Vision Films are drama based on radio serials and action-thriller based on true stories.

In 1990, two films were released: Nagsimula sa Puso and Kapag Langit ang Humatol, both were adapted from radio serials of DZRH AM radio.

In 1990 and 1991, another two action films Bala at Rosaryo starring Ramon "Bong" Revilla Jr. and Ganti ng Api starring Ronnie Ricketts were respectively released.

In 1993, Vision Films was absorbed into newly inaugurated Star Cinema. This time, it became a subsidiary of the ABS-CBN Corporation. The last film released by Vision Films was Isang Bala Ka Lang: Part 2 (1993), starring Fernando Poe Jr.

Star Cinema (1993–present)

Star Cinema was founded on May 8, 1993 to transform ABS-CBN Broadcasting Corporation into a true entertainment company. Although still a new player in the film industry, Star Cinema has poised itself to be a major competitor of big film companies like Viva Films and Regal Entertainment. Its strategies to reflect the viewer's current taste and trends has proven to be successful starting from the 1990s with a string of films targeted to mainstream viewers with film genres ranging from action, drama, comedy, horror, and fantasy. The films of Star Cinema in the 1990s has been well received with some earning critical acclaims with films including May Minamahal (1993), Maalaala Mo Kaya (1994), Madrasta (1996), Magic Temple (1996), and Bata, Bata… Pa'no Ka Ginawa? (1998). The 1990s also saw the pioneering works of the company by hiring third-party companies to integrate state-of-the-art computer generated images and special effects and makeup/prosthetic into some of its films like Patayin sa Sindak si Barbara (1995), Magic Temple (1996), Kokey (1997), Magandang Hatinggabi (1998), Hiling (1998), and Puso ng Pasko (1998) among others. Other notable works are live-action adaptations of popular Japanese anime series like Sarah... Ang Munting Prinsesa (1995) and Cedie (1996), in turn based on children's novels by English playwright and author Frances Hodgson Burnett, which incorporates stylish production designs and costumes and was shot abroad. Star Cinema also made a film adaptation of ABS-CBN's phenomenon TV series with films like Mara Clara: The Movie, released in 1996 and Mula Sa Puso: The Movie, Wansapanataym: The Movie and Esperanza: The Movie are released in 1999. In 1997, 1998 and 2000, Star Cinema produced Goodbye America, Legacy, and Doomsdayer respectively under the banner of Star Pacific Cinema in an attempt to penetrate the Hollywood B-movie market.

The year 2000 and beyond has been the most successful time for Star Cinema in terms of box office gross. In this period, Star Cinema's films are topping the box office chart in the Philippines which regularly garners an average of 70% of the local film market (excluding foreign films) based from the filings of ABS-CBN Corporation in the Philippine Stock Exchange. Most of the all-time highest-grossing films in the history of the Philippines are either produced or co-produced by Star Cinema as reported by Box Office Mojo. In 2002, Star Cinema together with Unitel Pictures released the Filipino-American film American Adobo with mixed reviews in the United States. In 2010, Star Cinema co-financed and released RPG Metanoia, the first 3D computer animated Filipino film in history. In 2013, Star Cinema co-financed and released Erik Matti's On the Job with mixed to positive reviews abroad. Star Cinema films that was well received by critics in this period were Anak (2000), Tanging Yaman (2000), Bagong Buwan (2001), Dekada '70 (2002), Nasaan Ka Man (2005), Kasal, Kasali, Kasalo (2006), In My Life (2009) and On the Job (2013).

Star Creatives Television

The television unit of ABS-CBN Film Productions is Star Creatives TV, it was established in 1997 to produce telenovelas for the ABS-CBN television network. It started its television venture in 1997 with Esperanza, a soap opera starring Judy Ann Santos in the title role. Its ratings peaked at 68% on one of its episodes in 1997, the highest single episode rating on Philippine television series. After Esperanza ended, it was followed by Labs Ko Si Babe, the first romantic comedy television series on Philippines starring Jolina Magdangal and Marvin Agustin. When Labs Ko Si Babe bid farewell on air, Star Creatives produced another highly successful soap opera Pangako Sa 'Yo in 2000 starring Kristine Hermosa and Jericho Rosales. Its ratings peaked at 64.9% on its finale episode, the highest rating finale episode on Philippine TV. Pangako Sa'yo also became popular abroad specially in Southeast Asia and Africa. It was followed by another successful series Kay Tagal Kang Hinintay (2002). In 2008, its most expensive television production Lobo (known internationally as She Wolf) received the Banff World Media Festival for best telenovela program and earned Angel Locsin an International Emmy Awards nomination for best performance of an actress. Sana Maulit Muli (2008) also gained a following in Taiwan when it was dubbed in Taiwanese Minnan. Kahit Isang Saglit (2008) became a finalist in the 37th International Emmy Awards. Its 2010 production Magkaribal became a finalist to the 2011 New York International Independent Film and Video Festival for best telenovela. Budoy (2011) is also a finalist to the 2013 New York Festivals International Television and Film Awards. Bridges of Love (2015) is the first Philippine telenovela to be released in Latin American countries including Peru. Soap operas produced by Star Creatives had been subtitled and dubbed to several languages including English, Spanish, Turkish, Khmer, Mandarin and French and most notably those that are targeted to Asia Pacific and South Africa. One of the programs dubbed in French is Kay Tagal Kang Hinintay which will cater to French-speaking audience in Africa and Europe. Star Cinema has also produced TV promos, spots and specials for the ABS-CBN network. In 2011, Star Cinema spent  for the Philippine National Anthem video clip of ABS-CBN network.

Star Home Video
 
Star Recording Inc. is the home video and DVD distribution arm of ABS-CBN Film Productions operating as Star Home Video (formerly known as Star Records Video). It is the exclusive home video distributor of the Star Cinema film library along with other ABS-CBN Film Productions' units like Cinema One Originals, the ABS-CBN Archives through its ABS-CBN Film Restoration label as well as ABS-CBN programs, karaoke CDs and some international films via Skyfilms.

Television productions

Previously-produced shows
Aired on Kapamilya Channel, Kapamilya Online Live, A2Z and  iWantTFC. 

 He's Into Her (May 28, 2021 – August 3, 2022)

Film distribution
 
Star Cinema distributes all of its films as well as movies produced by other production companies. In recent years, due to the popularity of independent films, Star Cinema created new divisions that would cater the niche markets. These are Sine Screen and Skylight Films. Star Cinema also redistributes classic films restored by ABS-CBN Film Archives and Central Digital Lab, Inc. In 2015, Star Cinema released the Cinema One Originals film That Thing Called Tadhana with critical and box office success. The film went on to gross over  against its budget of only two-million pesos.

Filmography

See also
Rise Artists Studio

References

External links
 

 
Entertainment companies of the Philippines
Film production companies of the Philippines
Philippine film studios
Film distributors
Mass media companies established in 1993
Television production companies of the Philippines
Companies based in Quezon City
Assets owned by ABS-CBN Corporation